Mancha Khiri is a district (amphoe) in the southern part of Khon Kaen province, northeastern Thailand.

Geography
Neighboring districts are (from the north clockwise): Nong Ruea, Ban Fang, Phra Yuen, Ban Haet, Ban Phai, Chonnabot, Khok Pho Chai of Khon Kaen Province; Kaeng Khro and Ban Thaen of Chaiyaphum province.

History
The district was renamed from Kut Khao to Mancha Khiri in 1939.

Administration
The district is divided into eight subdistricts (tambons), which are further subdivided into 116 villages (mubans). Mancha Khiri is a township (thesaban tambon) and covers parts of tambon Kut Khao. There are a further eight tambon administrative organizations (TAO).

Missing numbers belong to subdistricts which now form Khok Pho Chai District.

References

External links
amphoe.com

Mancha Khiri